C&P may refer to:

 C&P Telephone or Chesapeake and Potomac Telephone Company
 Cumberland and Pennsylvania Railroad, a former American railroad that operated in Western Maryland

See also
C&P Haulage v Middleton, a 1983 English contract law case
CP (disambiguation)